Thea Louise Stjernesund (born 24 November 1996) is a Norwegian World Cup alpine ski racer and specializes in the technical events of slalom and giant slalom.

Career
Competing at the 2016 and 2017 Junior World Championships, her best individual result was eighth in giant slalom, but she also won a mixed team bronze medal in 2016.

Stjernesund made her World Cup debut in October 2018 in the season opener at Sölden, and collected her first points with a ninth-place finish. Her second-best result during the season was twelfth place in Andorra in March. She was eighteenth in the giant slalom and fifth in the team event at the World Championships in February.

She represents the sports club Hakadal IL.

World Cup results

Season standings

Race podiums
 0 wins
 2 podiums – (1 GS, 1 PG); 13 top tens

World Championship results

Olympic Games

References

External links
 
 
 

1996 births
Living people
People from Nittedal
Norwegian female alpine skiers
Alpine skiers at the 2022 Winter Olympics
Olympic alpine skiers of Norway
Medalists at the 2022 Winter Olympics
Olympic medalists in alpine skiing
Olympic bronze medalists for Norway
Sportspeople from Viken (county)